Gregory Howard may refer to:

 Gregory M. Howard, American pastor and professor of religious studies
 Gregory Allen Howard (born 1962), American screenwriter
 Greg Howard (musician) (born 1964), American musician
 Greg Howard (basketball) (born 1948), American basketball player
 Greg Howard (politician), American politician in Connecticut